Adventures on Kythera is an Australian children's television series about five children who have adventures on the Greek island of Kythera.

It premiered on 13 August 1991 on the Nine Network and aired until 1992. There were 13 episodes filmed but it was screened as two series, consisting of seven and six episodes. The series was produced and directed by John Tatoulis and written by Deborah Parsons.

The series also aired in the United Kingdom on the ITV network between summer 1991 and Easter 1992.

Cast
 Amelia Frid as Molly Leeds
 Rebekah Elmaloglou as Tik
 Zenton Chorny	as Zenton
 Garry Perazzo	as Spike
 George Lekkas as Johnny 
 Richard Aspel as Vincent
 Tassos Ioannides as Philippas
 Kerry Noonan as Pia
 Michelle Royal as Annie

References

External links
 
 at Australian television Information Archive

Australian children's television series
1991 Australian television series debuts
1992 Australian television series endings
Television shows set in Greece
Kythira